Thoothukudi is an Industrial City and it has transport connections via road, rail, sea and air. After Chennai, Thoothukudi is the only city in Tamil Nadu to have all four means of transport.

Roadways

Thoothukudi City is well connected by road. The Major Highways are,

 Thoothukudi– Madurai– Tiruchirappalli– Viluppuram- Vellore (NH-38)
 Thoothukudi– Tirunelveli (NH-138)
 Thoothukudi– Ramanathapuram- Nagapattinam- Puducherry- Tindivanam- Chengalpattu- Chennai (NH-32)
 Thoothukudi– Palayakayal– Tiruchendur- Kudankulam- Kanyakumari (SH-176)

Railways

{
  "type": "FeatureCollection",
  "features": [
    {
      "type": "Feature",
      "properties": {},
      "geometry": {
        "type": "Point",
        "coordinates": [
          78.15550446510315,
          8.80611639474832
        ]
      }
    }
  ]
}

Thoothukudi railway station is one of the oldest railway stations in India and South Indian Railway began a Madras – Thoothukudi service connecting with the boat to Ceylon in 1899. The station was declared as Model Station in 2007 and several infrastructure developments are in process. There is also another station, known as Thoothukudi Melur.
It Has Suburban Stations Such As

Airport

It is located 15.6 km west from the city centre on Thoothukudi-Tirunelveli NH-7A. It was inaugurated by former chief minister of Tamil Nadu J. Jayalalithaa on 30 April 1992 and the former Minister of State for Civil Aviation and Tourism M. O. H. Farook presided with her. The airport was ISO 9001:2015 quality certified on 13 April 2018. It is the fifth busiest airport in Tamil Nadu after Chennai, Coimbatore, Tiruchirappalli and Madurai.

IndiGo are operating 4 flights direct daily to Chennai and 1 flight direct daily to Bengaluru.

The nearest international airport is Thiruvananthapuram International Airport in Kerala, which is about 198 km by road.

Seaport

V.O. Chidambaranar Port Authority is one of the 13 major ports in India. It was declared to be a major port on 11 July 1974. It is second-largest port in Tamil Nadu and fourth-largest container terminal in India. This is the third international port in Tamil Nadu and its second all-weather port. was constituted under the Major Port Authorities Act, 2021. It is an ISO 9001:2008,ISO 14001:2004 and ISPS compliant port. The port is named after V. O. Chidambaram Pillai, the eminent freedom fighter who was well known as Kappalottiya Thamizhan, meaning The Tamizhan man who rode the ship.

V.O. Chidambaranar Port Authority is the only port in South India to provide a direct weekly container service to the United States (transit time 22 days). There are regular weekly direct services to Europe (transit time 17 days), China (transit time 10 days) and Red Sea Ports (transit time 8 days).

A luxury ferry liner, the Scotia Prince, is conducting a ferry service to Colombo, Sri Lanka. Ferry services between the two countries have been revived after more than 20 years.

Spaceport

The Government of India is to set up a new Rocket launch pad near Kulasekaranpattinam in Thoothukudi district. The Indian Space Research Organisation (ISRO) has begun work on its second Rocket launching pad or Spaceport, which will be Kulasekaranpattinam, Thoothukudi in Tamil Nadu. Like the Sriharikota spaceport in the Satish Dhawan Space Centre, Thoothukudi was selected as a spaceport due to its nearness to the equator.
"A rocket launch site should be on the east coast and near the equator. And Thoothukudi district satisfies that condition", a former ISRO official stated.

References

External links
 Thoothukudi
 Thoothukudi Corporation
 Tuticorin Port Trust
 V.O. Chidambaranar Port Authority
 Tuticorin: Pearl of the south
 Tuticorin Churches

 
Thoothukudi
Thoothukudi